Gene-Haavard Dalby (born 5 May 1957) is a Norwegian poet.

Among his poetry collections are Linedanser på piggtråd from 1979, and Øm ulv from 1990. He published the books Frostknuter in 1982 and Den tatoverte tungen in 1987.

He was awarded Mads Wiel Nygaards Endowment in 1985.

References

1957 births
Living people
20th-century Norwegian poets
Norwegian male poets
20th-century Norwegian male writers